Héctor Mayagoitia Domínguez (born 7 January 1923) is a Mexican chemical bacteriologist and politician, who was a member of the Institutional Revolutionary Party, Governor of Durango between 1974 and 1979, and Director of the National Polytechnic Institute.

Biography
Domínguez was born in Victoria de Durango, Durango on 7 January 1923. In 1974, he was nominated by PRI as a candidate for Governor of Durango. Domínguez was elected and held the position until 1979 when, less than a year before finishing his term, he was appointed as Director of the National Polytechnic Institute. In 1983 he was also named Chief of a main directorate of the National Council of Science and Technology (CONACYT) and in 1988, he was elected as a Senator representing Durango. He has received numerous awards including Commission for Protected areas of Mexico (CONANP) Award for Nature Conservation for his pioneering efforts in the establishment of the first biosphere reserves in Mexico.

Domínguez celebrated his 100th birthday in 2023.

References

1923 births
Living people
20th-century Mexican politicians
Mexican chemists
Governors of Durango
Members of the Senate of the Republic (Mexico)
Politicians from Durango
People from Durango City
Institutional Revolutionary Party politicians
Mexican people of Basque descent
Men centenarians
Mexican centenarians